Bakočević (Montenegrin Cyrillic: Бакочевић) is a Serbian surname that originates from Montenegro. The Bakočevići was a brotherhood (bratstvo) of the Kuči from Zatrijebač. The family name is found in Kuči and Rovca in Montenegro, and Zlatibor and Mačva in Serbia. The families have the krsna slava (patron saint) of St. John (Jovanjdan). It may refer to:

People
Aleksandar Bakočević, Yugoslav Serbian politician
Radmila Bakočević, Serbian soprano
Nebojša Bakočević, Serbian actor
Vaso Bakočević, Montenegrin MMA fighter

Serbian surnames